Knežica may refer to:

 Knežica, Bosnia and Herzegovina, a village near Dubica
 Knežica, Croatia, a village near Dubrovnik
 Knežica (Doljevac), a village in Doljevac municipality, Serbia
 Knežica (Petrovac), a village in Petrovac na Mlavi municipality, Serbia